The 2005 South Sydney Rabbitohs season was the 96th in the club's history. Coached by Shaun McRae and captained by Bryan Fletcher and Peter Cusack, they competed in the National Rugby League's 2005 Telstra Premiership, finishing the regular season 13th out of 15 teams, failing to reach the finals.

In March, Souths life member Russell Crowe made the Rabbitohs the first club team in Australia to be sponsored by a film, when he negotiated a deal to advertise his movie Cinderella Man on their jerseys.
The Rabbitohs' first win of the season was a 49-26 triumph over the Parramatta Eels in Round 2.

The Rabbitohs would be winless again until Round 5, when they defeated the Newcastle Knights 37-12 at Bluetongue Central Coast Stadium in Gosford, before a crowd of 16,162.

For the next eight rounds, the Rabbitohs suffered loss after loss to the NRL juggernauts (including form teams Melbourne, Brisbane and Manly with the only relief being the bye in Round 8. After a promising start, Season 2005 was shaping up much like the last few years for the Rabbitohs.

However Round 13 against the Bulldogs was to prove a turning point in the club's season. Souths held the reigning premiers to a shock 21-all draw, and thereafter, momentum suddenly seemed to be swinging back the Bunnies' way. A week later they hammered Manly 44-6, and though they went on to lose three more consecutively after that (including a second to arch-rivals St George Illawarra Dragons), they bounced back to win 5 of their last 6, beginning with a 24-14 win over Cronulla at the Sydney Football Stadium, and highlighted with a spirited 16-14 downing of the North Queensland Cowboys at Dairy Farmers Stadium in Townsville. Finally overcoming the Bulldogs in Round 21, the Rabbitohs also defeated the Sydney Roosters in Sydney 17-16 in a hard fought and spiteful encounter. Their last match was against the Sharks at Toyota Stadium. Souths won this in convincing fashion, with young five-eighth John Sutton making a significant impression.

All in all, season 2005 was the most promising since re-admission; under coach Shaun McRae the team were beginning to look like a renewed force. Their reasonably strong finish handed the bottom place on the NRL ladder to the Newcastle Knights, therefore avoiding the horrible fate of receiving three wooden-spoons in a row. South Sydney finished the 2005 season level on 23 premiership points with 2004 premiers the Canterbury Bulldogs.

Ladder

Player statistics

Representative Honours

References

South Sydney Rabbitohs seasons
South Sydney Rabbitohs season